Clerodendrum heterophyllum (common names - Bois de chenilles, Verveine malgache) is a species of flowering plant in the genus Clerodendrum of the family Lamiaceae. It is a native to Mauritius and La Réunion.

In La Réunion it is found in the semi-dry forests in the West of the island, between Saint-Paul and Saint-Leu and it reaches a height of 4 meters.

It is naturalised in India, Australia (Western Australia and Queensland), Madagascar and the Mozambique Channel Islands.

References

External links

heterophyllum
Taxa named by Robert Brown (botanist, born 1773)